Tau gallicum (majuscule:Ꟈ(), minuscule: ꟈ()) is a letter that was used to write the Gaulish language. It is a D with the horizontal bar from the Greek letter Θ.

Name 
The Latin phrase  literally means "Gallic tau". The only known mention of the letter is found in Catalepton, a set of epigrams attributed to Virgil and collected after his death in Appendix Vergiliana. The second epigram contains the following text:

It is not known, however, whether the sound described by Virgil is the same as that for which the term is currently used.

Letter 
After using the Greek alphabet, the Gauls adopted the Latin alphabet to transcribe their language. However, they keep a few letters from the previous alphabet to note sounds unknown to the second. Tau gallicum is said to have been inspired by the Greek letter Θ (theta). Its spelling is very variable: one meets among others a crossed out D, resembling Đ but where the horizontal bar crosses completely the letter, as well as a form similar to the lowercase eth ð. The character then evolves to a double or single s crossed out, ss, then to one or two single s. 

The letter can be found in the initial of the name of the Celtic goddess Sirona, whose name is written as: Sirona, Ꟈirona or Thirona, highlighting the difficulty of noting the initial sound in the Latin alphabet.

The letter is also present in the lead of Chamalières, a lead tablet discovered in 1971 in Chamalières and written in the Gallic language with Latin cursive letters: snIeꟈꟈdic, aꟈꟈedillI.

Pronunciation 
The precise value of the sound transcribed by the Gallic tau is not known.

Use on computers

References 

D stroke
Palaeography